Central City Stadium is a multi-purpose stadium in Orsha, Belarus. It is mostly used for football matches and is a home stadium for FC Orsha. The stadium holds 2,582 spectators.

History
Central City Stadium has been a home ground for a local club FC Orsha. During 1998–1999 it also hosted home games of Lokomotiv-96 Vitebsk, whose usual home stadium Dinamo was closed for a renovation. At present, the stadium is part of Orsha Physical Culture and Sports Club, an organization which manages several other sport facilities in Orsha and neighboring towns.

References

External links
 Stadium information at FSK Orsha website

Football venues in Belarus
Buildings and structures in Vitebsk Region
Orsha
FC Orsha